Salmeen Khamis (Arabic:سالمين خميس) (born 9 October 1991) is an Emirati footballer. He currently plays as a defender for Shabab Al-Ahli.

External links

References

Emirati footballers
1991 births
Living people
Al Ahli Club (Dubai) players
Sharjah FC players
Shabab Al-Ahli Club players
UAE First Division League players
UAE Pro League players
Association football defenders